Proud American is a 2008 biographical drama film released by Slowhand Cinema, in both conventional 35mm, and IMAX format. It features five stories that intend to capture the essence of the American spirit, two of them chronicling the founding of Wal-Mart and Coca-Cola. The film is the lowest-grossing wide release in movie history, and was noted for having obtained additional revenue through overt sponsorship of the two companies, as well as MasterCard and American Airlines, whose product placement can be observed throughout the film.

Reception

Box office
The film was not well-received financially. Opening in 750 theaters, Proud American managed to earn only $96,076, or $128 per venue — making it the lowest-grossing wide release in movie history.

Critical reception
On review aggregator website Rotten Tomatoes, the film has an approval rating of 10%, based on 10 reviews, with an average rating of 2.9/10.

References

External links

2008 films
American documentary films
American independent films
IMAX films
Documentary films about business
Sponsored films
2008 drama films
American drama films
IMAX documentary films
Coca-Cola
Walmart
2000s English-language films
2000s American films